Junije is a masculine Serbian and Croatian given name derived from June. The Latin language version of this name is Junius while Italian version is Giunio. Croatian surname Žunjević, disappeared in the meantime, was based on Junije origin.

People
 Junije Palmotić  (?1606 - 1657) was a Ragusan baroque writer, poet and dramatist
 Giunio Resti, also known as Junije Rastić, (1755-1814), Ragusan politician and writer

See also 
 Giunio

References 

Slavic masculine given names
Serbian masculine given names
Croatian masculine given names
Masculine given names